The Cerro Prieto Geothermal Power Station is a complex of geothermal power stations in Baja California, Mexico. The facility is located just south of Mexicali and consists of five individual units, named CP1 through CP5.

Stations

Cerro Prieto I 
Units 1 and 2 of this powerhouse was commissioned between 1973, followed by 3 and 4 in 1981.

Cerro Prieto II

Cerro Prieto III
This powerhouse was commissioned in 1983, a year after the commissioning of CP2.

Cerro Prieto IV

Cerro Prieto V
The CP5 station  is the newest powerhouse of the Cerro Prieto station. It was proposed in July 2009, with the commencement of constructions in September 2009.

See also

 List of power stations in Mexico
 List of geothermal power stations
 List of largest power stations in the world

References

Geothermal power stations in Mexico
Mexicali
Buildings and structures in Baja California
Salton Trough